= Freedom philosophy =

Freedom philosophy may refer to:

- Libertarianism
- Classical liberalism
